Kamil Król (born 20 June 1987) is a Polish footballer who plays as a striker for MKS Opolanin.

He previously played for Górnik Zabrze, Brescia, Motor Lublin, Kluczbork and Górnik Polkowice.

His brother Rafał plays for the Polish club, Stal Kraśnik.

External links
 

1987 births
Living people
Polish footballers
Poland youth international footballers
Polish expatriate footballers
People from Janów Lubelski County
Sportspeople from Lublin Voivodeship
Association football forwards
Górnik Zabrze players
Brescia Calcio players
Motor Lublin players
MKS Kluczbork players
Górnik Polkowice players
Vyzas F.C. players
Chalkida F.C. players
Panargiakos F.C. players
Fostiras F.C. players
Panelefsiniakos F.C. players
Doxa Kranoula F.C. players
Stal Kraśnik players
Ekstraklasa players
Serie B players
Polish expatriate sportspeople in Italy
Polish expatriate sportspeople in Greece
Expatriate footballers in Italy
Expatriate footballers in Greece